The British Association for Slavonic and East European Studies, is a learned society in the United Kingdom dedicated to promoting study of Russia, Eastern Europe and the former Soviet Union. It is a member of the Academy of Social Sciences.

External links

References

Learned societies of the United Kingdom
Academic organisations based in the United Kingdom
Social sciences organizations